Sarah Gengler (born February 15, 1963; since marriage she has used the name Sarah Gengler-Dahl) is an American rower. She competed at the 1988 Summer Olympics and the 1992 Summer Olympics.

References

External links
 

1963 births
Living people
American female rowers
Olympic rowers of the United States
Rowers at the 1988 Summer Olympics
Rowers at the 1992 Summer Olympics
Sportspeople from Milwaukee
21st-century American women